Ktetor or ktitor, meaning 'founder', is a title given in the Middle Ages to the provider of funds for construction or reconstruction of an Eastern Orthodox church or monastery, for the addition of icons, frescos, and other works of art. It was used in the Byzantine sphere. A Catholic equivalent of the term is donator. At the time of founding, the ktetor often issued typika, and was illustrated on frescoes ("ktetor portrait").

Sources
 
 

History of Eastern Orthodoxy
Philanthropy
 
Byzantine culture
Greek words and phrases